The 2003 Czech Indoor Open Open was a men's tennis tournament played on indoor hard courts in Průhonice , Czech Republic, and was part of the 2003 ATP Challenger Series.

This was the second edition of the event and was held from 17 to 23 November 2003.

Karol Beck and Jaroslav Levinský were the defending champions, the first decided not to participate in this edition, the second lost in quarterfinals.

Martin Štěpánek and  Igor Zelenay won the title, defeating Karsten Braasch and Jean-Claude Scherrer 6–4, 4–6, 6–4 in the final.

Seeds

Draw

References
Main Draw

Draws on ITF Site

Czech Indoor Open